Barnim VII (1390 – 22 September 1450 in Wolgast) was the son of Duke Barnim VI, Duke of Pomerania.  He was from 1425 Duke of Pomerania-Wolgast-Demmin and later also Duke of Pomerania-Barth.  He supported his brother Wartislaw IX, Duke of Pomerania against Brandenburg.

Ancestors

References

Dukes of Pomerania
15th-century German nobility
1390 births
1450 deaths
People from Wolgast